The first translations of the Bible into Turkish date back to the 17th century, yet the first printed edition did not appear until the early 19th century. In more recent history, there has been a significant increase in the quality and quantity of translations.

Old translation 

The Bible was first translated into Ottoman Turkish in the 17th century by Wojciech Bobowski, a Polish convert to Islam. He is also known as Ali Bey. The New Testament from his manuscript was printed in Paris in 1819, then revised and printed with the Old Testament in 1827.

A new translation was published in Constantinople in 1878 and entitled Kitab-ı Mukaddes ("Holy Book"). Revised several times, this was the only Bible in the Arabic alphabet of Ottoman Turkish that stayed in print until the end of the Ottoman period.

In addition, Armeno-Turkish and Graeco-Turkish Bibles were produced in the Turkish spoken by these Ottoman minority peoples and written in their very different alphabets.

Seraphim Khojentzi translated the New Testament which was published by the Russian Bible Society in 1819. This edition used Armenian script.

Modern translations 
Following Mustafa Kemal Atatürk's orthographic reforms in 1928, a new translation/translation revision, this time written in the Latin script-based new Turkish alphabet was published in 1941. The language continued to change as Turkish removed many foreign words (especially of Arabic or Persian origin). In just sixty years, the language went through the equivalent of three hundred years of changes, thus many foreign words found in the old Turkish Bible were no longer used.

Because of this the United Bible Society and the Translation Trust joined together to produce a translation suited to the new language. This work is a colloquial version. The translators included Ali Şimşek, Behnan Konutgan and Mahmud Solgun. The translation consultants included the Rev. Dr. Manuel Jinbachian and Dr. Krijn van der Jagt. In 1989 the New Testament was published, one journalist saying the work "flows like music." The New Testament edition is called İNCİL: İncil'in Çağdaş Türkçe Çevirisi. The complete Bible was dedicated on October 21, 2001. It has the title, KUTSAL KİTAP Yeni Çeviri / Eski ve Yeni Antlaşma (Tevrat, Zebur, İncil).

A Turkish translation of the New Testament into simplified language was published in 2012, with the title, Halk Dilinde İncil: Sadeleştirilmiş İncil Tercümesi. The publication was launched at a reception at the Prestige Elite Hotel in Istanbul. The publisher is called Yeni Yaşam Yayınları, which translates in English as New Life Publications.

In 2011, an organization published a Turkish translation of the Gospel of Matthew, which used a paraphrase methodology. This was part of a wider controversy that arose among several mission agencies during 2012 with regard to how to translate certain words and phrases at the heart of Christian belief.

Thomas Cosmades translated the New Testament into Turkish. It was published in 1997 and 1998 by the Turkish Bible Society. A new revision of his translation was published in 2010 by Kutsal Söz Yayınları.

Jehovah's Witnesses released a translation of the Bible into Turkish, Kutsal Kitap Yeni Dünya Çevirisi, in 2008.

Style comparison

References

External links
 History of the Turkish Bible Translation
 A History of Turkish Bible Translations, Bruce Privratsky
 Ottoman Turkish Bible

Turkish
Christianity in Turkey
Turkish-language works